Strong Boy is a 1929 American silent comedy film directed by John Ford which had a synchronized music track. The film, which was Ford's last silent film, is now considered to be lost. A trailer for the film was discovered in the New Zealand Film Archive in 2010 and subsequently preserved by the Academy Film Archive the same year.

Cast
 Victor McLaglen as Strong Boy
 Leatrice Joy as Mary McGregor
 J. Farrell MacDonald as Angus McGregor
 Clyde Cook as Pete
 Buddy Roosevelt as Wilbur Watkins (credited as Kent Sanderson)
 Douglas Scott as Wobby
 Slim Summerville as Slim
 Tom Wilson as Baggage master
 Eulalie Jensen as Queen of Lisonia
 David Torrence as Railroad president
 Dolores Johnson as Prima donna
 Robert Ryan as Baggage man
 Jack Pennick as Baggage man

See also
List of lost films

References

External links

1929 films
1929 comedy films
Fox Film films
Silent American comedy films
American silent feature films
American black-and-white films
Films directed by John Ford
Lost American films
1929 lost films
Lost comedy films
1920s American films